Gazimuro-Zavodsky District  is an administrative and municipal district (raion), one of the thirty-one in Zabaykalsky Krai, Russia. It is located in the east and southeast of the krai, and borders with Mogochinsky District in the north, Nerchinsko-Zavodsky District in the east, Aleksandrovo-Zavodsky District in the south, and with Sretensky District in the west. Its administrative center is the rural locality (a selo) of Gazimursky Zavod. Population:  9,578 (2002 Census);  The population of Gazimursky Zavod accounts for 28.2% of the district's total population.

History
The district was established on January 4, 1926.

References

Notes

Sources

Districts of Zabaykalsky Krai
States and territories established in 1926

